Islamism (political Islam) has existed in the United Kingdom since the 1970s, and has become widely visible and a topic of political discourse since the beginning of the 21st century.

Islam in the United Kingdom has grown rapidly due to immigration since the 1980s. In 2011, 2.7 million Muslims (4.8% of total population) lived in the UK (mostly in England), more than quintupling over a 30-year period (550,000 in 1981), with a continued tendency of rapid growth.

Early history
Radical Islam has been present in Great Britain since the 1970s, but has not received wider public attention prior to the  7 July 2005 London bombings;  terrorism in Britain during the 1970s to 1990s was mostly due to the Northern Ireland conflict, and it was only after the 2005 incidents that the presence of radical political Islam in Britain was widely recognized and studied.

Dawatul Islam is an  Islamist organisation based in London, founded in 1978 from the Jamaat-e-Islami Pakistan-originated UK Islamic Mission to cater to East Bengali Muslims in Britain after the founding of Bangladesh in 1971.

Syrian Islamist Omar Bakri Muhammad moved to the United Kingdom in 1986, and established a chapter of Hizb ut-Tahrir, and later 
Al-Muhajiroun ("The Emigrants"), which was proscribed under the Terrorism Act 2000 on 14 January 2010. 
Social disturbance began in the Muslim community in England in 1988 with the publication of the satirical novel The Satanic Verses in London. The book was condemned with a fatwa the following year.

In 1989, an Islamic Party of Britain was founded by a Sheffield-born convert.

The Islamic Forum of Europe was founded in 1990.
It was reportedly founded by former members of the Jamaat-e-Islami-affiliated group Dawatul Islam, with whom it came into  conflict over management of the East London Mosque "throughout the late 1980s" resulting in "two High Court injunctions" in 1990 in "response to violence" at the mosque.

The Islamic Society of Britain (ISB) was set up in 1990  to promote Islamic values.  The Young Muslims UK, established in 1984, was incorporated into ISB as its youth wing. In 1997, some supporters of the Muslim Brotherhood "broke off" from ISB to form the Muslim Association of Britain.

Development after 2005

The Saved Sect operated from 2005 but was banned in 2006.
The extent of the phenomenon was illustrated during the Jyllands-Posten Muhammad cartoons controversy of 2006, when Al Ghurabaa, successor organisation to the disbanded Al-Muhajiroun, called Muslims to "Kill those who insult the Prophet Muhammad", resulting in extensive protests in London.

Following the 2005 terror attacks, the phenomenon of Islamism within the resident Muslim population in Britain receive wider interest.
An early publication was Londonistan: How Britain is Creating a Terror State Within (2006). Undercover Mosque aired in 2007 (with a 2008 sequel).
Islam4UK led by Anjem Choudary (a British Pakistani born in the UK 1967) had been active from 2009. It has also been banned under the Terrorism Act 2000 on 14 January 2010.

Since 2006, the Islamic Forum of Europe (IFE) has been under scrutiny as fostering Islamist politics among Bangladeshi immigrants. IFE and the East London Mosque, have hosted extremist preachers including Anwar al-Awlaki.  
A Dispatches documentary aired on 1 March 2010 suggested the IFE are an extremist organization with a hidden agenda that went against Britain's democratic values. Dispatches quoted Azad Ali, the IFE's community affairs coordinator, as saying, "Democracy, if it means at the expense of not implementing the sharia, of course no one agrees with that". 
Responding in a comment piece in the Guardian newspaper, Inayat Bunglawala of the Muslim Council of Britain suggested that many of the people interviewed on the programme had "hidden agendas of their own" suggesting that Jim Fitzpatrick's claim of the Labour Party having been "infiltrated" by IFE was motivated by upcoming elections.
The IFE and YMO were featured in the book The Islamist (2007) by Ed Husain, where he explains that the YMO attracts mainly English-speaking Asian youths, providing circles or talks daily at the East London Mosque; while teaching about Islam, it covers the political system of the religion.

The Islamic Human Rights Commission (IHRC, established in 1997) was classified as "a radical Islamist organisation that uses the language and techniques of a human rights lobbying group to promote an extremist agenda"  by the Stephen Roth Institute in 2005.

See also

Criticism of Islamism
Islamist terrorism in the United Kingdom
British Muslim identity
Islamophobia in the United Kingdom
Muslim Council of Britain
Mosques and Imams National Advisory Board
United Kingdom and ISIL
CONTEST

References